Enterprise is a city in Dickinson County, Kansas, United States.  As of the 2020 census, the population of the city was 708.

History
The first settlement at Enterprise was in 1868, and Enterprise was laid out in 1872. It was named for the enterprising qualities of the pioneer settlers.

The first post office in Enterprise was established in January, 1873.

On January 10, 1883, the Enterprise Town Company, capital $50,000, was organized. The following officers were elected: V. P. Wilson, president; John Johntz, vice-president; C. Hoffman, treasurer; T. C. Henry, secretary.

In 1887, Atchison, Topeka and Santa Fe Railway built a branch line from Neva (3 miles west of Strong City) through Enterprise to Superior, Nebraska.  In 1996, the Atchison, Topeka and Santa Fe Railway merged with Burlington Northern Railroad and renamed to the current BNSF Railway.  Most locals still refer to this railroad as the "Santa Fe".

On January 23, 1901, temperance movement leader Carrie Nation and her followers wrecked a saloon in Enterprise.

Geography
Enterprise is located at  (38.902485, -97.118172).

Climate
The climate in this area is characterized by hot, humid summers and generally mild to cool winters.  According to the Köppen Climate Classification system, Enterprise has a humid subtropical climate, abbreviated "Cfa" on climate maps.

Demographics

2010 census
As of the census of 2010, there were 855 people, 294 households, and 221 families residing in the city. The racial makeup of the city was 93.3% White, 0.9% African American, 0.4% Native American, 0.4% Asian, 0.1% Pacific Islander, 1.6% from other races, and 3.3% from two or more races. Hispanic or Latino of any race were 4.1% of the population.

There were 294 households, of which 37.8% had children under the age of 18 living with them, 56.1% were married couples living together, 12.9% had a female householder with no husband present, 6.1% had a male householder with no wife present, and 24.8% were non-families. 22.4% of all households were made up of individuals, and 10.5% had someone living alone who was 65 years of age or older. The average household size was 2.66 and the average family size was 3.03.

The median age in the city was 34.9 years. 28.1% of residents were under the age of 18; 8.3% were between the ages of 18 and 24; 23.1% were from 25 to 44; 23.6% were from 45 to 64; and 16.7% were 65 years of age or older. The gender makeup of the city was 46.7% male and 53.3% female.

2000 census

As of the census of 2000, there were 836 people, 299 households, and 218 families residing in the city. The racial makeup of the city was 96.77% White, 0.24% African American, 0.84% Native American, 0.12% Asian, and 2.03% from two or more races. Hispanic or Latino of any race were 0.84% of the population.

There were 299 households, out of which 37.1% had children under the age of 18 living with them, 59.5% were married couples living together, 9.7% had a female householder with no husband present, and 26.8% were non-families. 23.7% of all households were made up of individuals, and 12.0% had someone living alone who was 65 years of age or older. The average household size was 2.64 and the average family size was 3.11.

In the city, the population was spread out, with 27.6% under the age of 18, 7.3% from 18 to 24, 23.9% from 25 to 44, 21.5% from 45 to 64, and 19.6% who were 65 years of age or older. The median age was 38 years. For every 100 females, there were 82.1 males. For every 100 females age 18 and over, there were 80.6 males.

As of 2000 the median income for a household in the city was $36,613, and the median income for a family was $39,479. Males had a median income of $28,214 versus $20,357 for females. The per capita income for the city was $15,619. About 7.8% of families and 8.5% of the population were below the poverty line, including 7.0% of those under age 18 and 11.3% of those age 65 or over.

Education
The community is served by Chapman USD 473 public school district.  The Chapman High School mascot is Chapman Fighting Irish.  Enterprise claims the title of the first town to offer kindergarten in the state.  Enterprise High School was closed through school unification. The Enterprise High School mascot was Enterprise Bulldogs.

See also
 Abilene and Smoky Valley Railroad

References

Further reading

External links

City
 City of Enterprise
 Enterprise - Directory of Public Officials
Historical
 Historic Images of Enterprise, Special Photo Collections at Wichita State University Library
 J.B. Ehrsam building was demolished in 2011
Maps
 Enterprise city map, KDOT

Cities in Kansas
Cities in Dickinson County, Kansas
Populated places established in 1883
1883 establishments in Kansas